East Fort Wayne Street Historic District is a national historic district located at Warsaw, Kosciusko County, Indiana. The district encompasses 14 contributing buildings in an exclusively residential section of Warsaw. It developed between about 1860 and 1920, and includes notable examples of Italianate, Queen Anne, and Bungalow / American Craftsman style architecture. Notable buildings include the Hudson Beck House (1874), Samuel Chipman House (1860), and Meyers House (1917).

It was listed on the National Register of Historic Places in 1993.

References

Historic districts on the National Register of Historic Places in Indiana
Italianate architecture in Indiana
Queen Anne architecture in Indiana
Historic districts in Kosciusko County, Indiana
National Register of Historic Places in Kosciusko County, Indiana